is a former international table tennis player from Japan.

Table tennis career
From 1978 to 1983 he won several medals in singles, doubles, and team events in the World Table Tennis Championships and in the Asian Table Tennis Championships.

The four World Championship medals included a gold medal in the men's singles at the 1979 World Table Tennis Championships. He also competed at the 1988 Summer Olympics.

See also
 List of table tennis players
 List of World Table Tennis Championships medalists

References

1956 births
Living people
Japanese male table tennis players
People from Seiyo, Ehime
Asian Games medalists in table tennis
Table tennis players at the 1982 Asian Games
Olympic table tennis players of Japan
Medalists at the 1982 Asian Games
Asian Games gold medalists for Japan
Asian Games silver medalists for Japan
Asian Games bronze medalists for Japan
Table tennis players at the 1988 Summer Olympics